The Olympus E-1, introduced in 2003, was the first DSLR system camera designed from the ground up for digital photography This contrasts with its contemporaries which offered systems based on reused parts from previous 135 film systems, modified to fit with a sensor size of APS-C.

Features
The E-1 uses the Four Thirds System lens mount and imaging system. This design choice means that because the CCD is smaller than a 35 mm negative, Four Thirds System lenses and camera bodies can be made smaller and lighter than those of preceding SLRs.

Characteristics:
Lighter/more compact than contemporary DSLR bodies
5 megapixel CCD
Good dynamic range and exposure
Magnesium-alloy body
Environmental sealing (splash proof)
"Supersonic Wave Filter" dust reduction system cleans CCD at each camera start-up (dust is shaken off the CCD)
USB 2.0 and FireWire connectivity
Continuous shooting 3 frames per second up to 12 frames
Hybrid white balance sensor (on external surface of camera and using CCD)
User upgradeable firmware

Sometimes the user experiences bright spots in long (greater than a few seconds) exposures. This is called long exposure noise. By turning on the "Noise Removal" (not "Noise Filter"), the E-1 will do a “dark frame subtraction” to get rid of these erroneous bright spots.

The development of the E-1 involved the revitalization of Olympus' old Zuiko lens brand, through a new range named "Zuiko Digital" with the Four Thirds system lens mount. The E-1 was usually sold bundled with a splash proof Zuiko Digital 14–54 mm 1:2.8–3.5 zoom lens.

Olympus initially gave away free adapters to connect OM lenses to the new Four Thirds System mount. This adapter allowed a wide range of OM lenses to be used with the new Olympus DSLRs. The adapter is no longer given away for free, but is still available for purchase from authorised Olympus resellers.

References

External links 
 E-1 photos and review
 Olympus E-1 Specifications

E-1
Four Thirds System
Cameras introduced in 2003